Enho may refer to: 

 Enhō Akira, Japanese sumo wrestler
 ENHO, Energy Homeostasis Associated gene coding for adropin